Clement Noel Calnan (25 December 1888 – 30 January 1974) was an English cricketer. Calnan's batting and bowling styles are unknown. He was born at Mile End, Middlesex.

Calnan made his first-class debut for Essex against Yorkshire in the 1919 County Championship. He made a further first-class appearance for the county in that season, against the Australian Imperial Forces. He later made two further first-class appearances for the county in the 1929 County Championship, against Surrey and Somerset. In his four first-class matches, he scored a total of 49 runs at an average of 6.12, with a high score of 24.

He died at Southend-on-Sea, Essex, on 30 January 1974.

References

External links
Clem Calnan at ESPNcricinfo
Clem Calnan at CricketArchive

1888 births
1974 deaths
People from Mile End
English cricketers
Essex cricketers